The Peugeot 208 Rally4 is a rally car developed and built by Peugeot Sport for the Rally Pyramid regulation of the Rally4 category. It is based upon the Peugeot 208 road car and was launched in 2020 and is a successor to Peugeot 208 R2.

Competition history
The car made its debut at the 2020 Castelo Branco Rally of Portugal.

Rally victories

Regional championships

European Rally Championship-3

References

External links

 Peugeot 208 Rally4 at eWRC-results.com

Rally4 cars
Peugeot vehicles